During the 1941–42 season Associazione Sportiva Roma competed in Serie A and Coppa Italia.

Summary 
The 1941–42 Serie A campaign started with a delay of one month. Actually Roma was non favourite to win the title due to last season results with an 11th spot. Igino Betti left the club leadership to Edgardo Bazzini. The team grab the transferred in Edmondo Mornese from Novara, winger Renato Cappellini from Napoli, known as "Il barone" by giallorossi fans, defender Sergio Andreoli and, nearby closure of the transfers market, goalkeeper Fosco Risorti. The squad showed a competitive style of play clinching the leader spot of the table from the very first round. On 1 February 1942 clinched the Winter championship and on 14 June won its first Italian title ever, thanks to the victory 2–0 against Modena scoring Renato Cappellini. and Ermes Borsetti: the club broke the Northern Supremacy on scudetto winning champions ending the trophy to a squad from center-south of Italy.

Squad 
Source:

 (Captain)

Transfers

Competitions

Serie A

League table

Matches

Coppa Italia

Round of 32

Statistics

Squad statistics 
Source:

Players statistics

Appearances
0.Ippolito Ippoliti 
30.Guido Masetti 
1.Fosco Risorti
10.Mario Acerbi 
20.Sergio Andreoli 
31.Luigi Brunella 
1.Luigi Nobile
25.Giuseppe Bonomi 
18.Renato Cappellini 
31.Aristide Coscia 
1.Mario De Grassi 
9.Luigi Di Pasquale 
29.Aldo Donati
7.Paolo Jacobini
24.Naim Krieziu
30.Edmondo Mornese 
31.Amedeo Amadei 
3.Cesare Benedetti 
9.Ermes Borsetti 
31.Miguel Ángel Pantó

Goalscorers
18.Amedeo Amadei
12.Miguel Ángel Pantó
6.Naim Krieziu
4.Renato Cappellini 
4.Aristide Coscia 
2.Luigi Di Pasquale
2.Aldo Donati
6.Naim Krieziu
1.Edmondo Mornese 
4.Ermes Borsetti

References

Bibliography

Videography

External links 
 
 

A.S. Roma seasons
Roma
Italian football championship-winning seasons